The Confederation of Japan Automobile Workers' Unions (JAW, Jidosha Soren) is a trade union representing workers in the car manufacturing industry in Japan.

From the early 1960s, most car workers' unions in Japan were part of one of two federations: the Federation of Japan Automobile Workers' Unions, led by the Nissan Union, and Zenkoku Jidosha, led by the Toyota Union, and established in 1962.  Encouraged by the International Metalworkers' Federation, in 1965, they established a forum to discuss matters of mutual interest.  In 1972, this and the two federations were replaced by the JAW.  The new union was led by president Ichiro Shoji, and had around 500,000 members.

While the union did not initially affiliate to a trade union federation, in 1989 it became a founding affiliate of the Japanese Trade Union Confederation.  At this time, it was the second largest union in the country, with 704,000 members.  As of 2020, its membership had grown further, to 784,777.

References

External links

Trade unions established in 1972
Trade unions in Japan
Vehicle industry trade unions